Katalin Engelhardt (born 17 March 1971) is a former Hungarian Paralympic swimmer and Paralympic powerlifter. She has participated at seven Paralympic Games in swimming and has won six medals, including one gold at the 1996 Summer Paralympics in Atlanta. Engelhardt was born with a leg impairment which didn't form properly in her mother's womb.

References

1971 births
Living people
Swimmers from Budapest
Paralympic swimmers of Hungary
Paralympic powerlifters of Hungary
Swimmers at the 1992 Summer Paralympics
Swimmers at the 1996 Summer Paralympics
Swimmers at the 2000 Summer Paralympics
Swimmers at the 2004 Summer Paralympics
Swimmers at the 2008 Summer Paralympics
Swimmers at the 2012 Summer Paralympics
Swimmers at the 2016 Summer Paralympics
Medalists at the 1992 Summer Paralympics
Medalists at the 1996 Summer Paralympics
Medalists at the 2000 Summer Paralympics
Medalists at the 2004 Summer Paralympics
Paralympic medalists in swimming
Paralympic gold medalists for Hungary
Paralympic silver medalists for Hungary
Paralympic bronze medalists for Hungary
Hungarian female breaststroke swimmers
Hungarian female butterfly swimmers
Hungarian female medley swimmers
S5-classified Paralympic swimmers
Medalists at the World Para Swimming Championships
20th-century Hungarian women
21st-century Hungarian women